Joseph Danielsen is an American Democratic Party politician, who represents the 17th Legislative District in the New Jersey General Assembly, where he has served since October 16, 2014, after being appointed to fill the vacant seat of Upendra J. Chivukula, who left office to take a seat as a Commissioner on the New Jersey Board of Public Utilities.

Danielsen has served in the General Assembly as Deputy Whip since 2020.

Early life 
A lifelong resident of Franklin Township, Danielsen is an IT consultant and owner of Network Blade LLC.  He is a veteran of the United States Army Reserve, having served in the 78th Div. Reserve TNG from 1982 to 1991, as well as a volunteer fire fighter for 22 years. He was as a member of the Franklin Township Fire District No. 1 Board of Fire Commissioners from 2000 to 2006. During his term he was integral in creating an inter-local agreement between the township and the four fire districts that provided fire fighters during the day. From 1997 until 2010, Danielsen served on the Franklin Township Planning Board, including a stint as vice chair for several of those years. In that role, he supported economic development and helped attract businesses to Franklin Township while maintaining the local historic character. He is the head of the Franklin Township Municipal Democratic Committee. Danielsen received an A.S. in Marketing, Art, and Design from Middlesex County College and a B.A. in Visual Arts from Rutgers University. The youngest of nine children, he remains a resident of Franklin Township with his wife Christine and their three children.

New Jersey Assembly 
Danielsen was appointed to fill the vacant seat of Upendra J. Chivukula, who left office to take a seat as a Commissioner on the New Jersey Board of Public Utilities, and took office on October 16, 2014.

Committee assignments 
Committee assignments for the 2022—23 Legislative Session session are:
Oversight, Reform and Federal Relations, Chair
Agriculture and Food Security
Financial Institutions and Insurance

District 17 
Each of the 40 districts in the New Jersey Legislature has one representative in the New Jersey Senate and two members in the New Jersey General Assembly. The representatives from the 17th District for the 2022—23 Legislative Session are:
Senator Bob Smith  (D)
Assemblyman Joseph Danielsen  (D)
Assemblyman Joseph V. Egan  (D)

Electoral history

New Jersey Assembly

References

External links
Assemblyman Danielsen's legislative web page, New Jersey Legislature

1965 births
Date of birth missing (living people)
Living people
Democratic Party members of the New Jersey General Assembly
People from Franklin Township, Somerset County, New Jersey
Politicians from Somerset County, New Jersey
Rutgers University alumni
United States Army soldiers
21st-century American politicians
Middlesex County College alumni